Cychropsis nepalensis is a species of ground beetle in the subfamily of Carabinae. It was described by Mandl in 1965.

References

nepalensis
Beetles described in 1965